Megachile mongolica is a species of bee in the family Megachilidae. It was described by Morawitz in 1890.

References

Mongolica
Insects described in 1890